82P/Gehrels is a periodic comet that was discovered on October 27, 1975, by Tom Gehrels at the Palomar Mountain Observatory in California having a faint nuclear brightness of magnitude 17.

Calculations based on the early sightings gave an estimated perihelion of 23 April 1975 and an orbital period of 8.11 years. It was observed by J. Gibson on its next predicted apparition in 1984, using the 122-cm Schmidt at Palomar, when he estimated the nuclear brightness at a very faint magnitude 20. It has since been observed in 1993, 2001 and 2010.

The object has been identified as a quasi-Hilda comet, which means it is near a 3:2 mean-motion resonance with the planet Jupiter. It fits the definition of an Encke-type comet with (TJupiter > 3; a < aJupiter). It has an estimated diameter of 1.46 km.

On 15 August 1970 the comet passed  from Jupiter.

Add list
 List of numbered comets

References

External links 
 Orbital simulation from JPL (Java) / Horizons Ephemeris

Periodic comets
Encke-type comets
0082
Jupiter
Comets in 2018
19751027